Stigma or plural stigmata, stigmas may refer to:

 Social stigma, the disapproval of a person based on physical or behavioral characteristics that distinguish them from others

Symbolism
 Stigmata, bodily marks or wounds resembling the crucifixion wounds of Christ
 A badge of shame, or stigma, an insignia, badge, brand, or designator of infamy or disgrace

Biology
 Stigma (anatomy), a small spot, mark, scar, or minute hole
 Stigma (botany), part of the female reproductive part of a flower
 Pterostigma, a cell in the outer wing of insects

Writing
 Stigma (letter), a ligature of the Greek letters sigma and tau (ϛ), also used as the Greek numeral 6

Arts, entertainment and media

Books
 Stigma: Notes on the Management of Spoiled Identity, a 1963 book written by Erving Goffman
 Stigma, a Japanese manga story by Kazuya Minekura

Film and television
 Stigma (1972 film), a film featuring Philip Michael Thomas
 Stigma (1977 film), originally broadcast as part of the BBC's Ghost Story for Christmas series
 Stigma (2013 film), a Nigerian drama film
 "Stigma" (Star Trek: Enterprise), a 2003 second-season episode of Star Trek: Enterprise

Music
 Stigma (band), an Italian band
 Stigma (EMF album), 1992
 Stigma (Mind Assault album), 2008
 Stigma, a 2005 album by Yōsei Teikoku
 "Stigma", a 2010 song from the album Split the Atom by Noisia
 "Stigma", a 2016 song from the album Wings by Korean band BTS

Sports
 Stigma (wrestler), American professional wrestler
 Stigma (luchador), Mexican professional wrestler

See also
 Stigmata (disambiguation)